Eric Enstrom (1875 near Mora, Sweden – November 16, 1968 in Grand Rapids, Minnesota, USA, after retiring to Coleraine) was a Swedish-born American photographer. He became famous for his 1918 photograph of Charles Wilden in Bovey, Minnesota. The photo is now known as Grace and depicts Wilden saying a prayer over a simple meal. In 2002, "Grace" was designated the state photograph of Minnesota. In 2007, Richard Palmer declared it “the true spirit of Minnesota”.

References

External links
GRACE by Enstrom - Website for Photograph

1875 births
1968 deaths
American photographers
Swedish photographers
Artists from Minnesota
Swedish emigrants to the United States